In Greek mythology, Cretheus (Ancient Greek: Κρηθεύς Krētheus) may refer to the following characters:

 Cretheus, king and founder of Iolcus, the son of King Aeolus of Aeolia (son of Hellen) by either Enarete or Laodice. He was the brother of Sisyphus, Athamas, Salmoneus, Deion, Magnes, Perieres, Canace, Alcyone, Peisidice, Calyce and Perimede. Cretheus's wives were Tyro, his niece, and Demodice or Biadice. With Tyro, he fathered Aeson, Pheres, and Amythaon. When Cretheus found out that Tyro had an affair with Poseidon, he left her and married Demodice. He also had several daughters, namely Hippolyte, future wife of Acastus (otherwise known as Astydameia), Myrina who married Thoas, and possibly Phalanna, eponym of Phalanna.

 Cretheus, also known as Cres, the Cretan father of an unnamed daughter who became the mother of Asterius by Teutamus.

Notes

References 

Diodorus Siculus, The Library of History translated by Charles Henry Oldfather. Twelve volumes. Loeb Classical Library. Cambridge, Massachusetts: Harvard University Press; London: William Heinemann, Ltd. 1989. Vol. 3. Books 4.59–8. Online version at Bill Thayer's Web Site
Diodorus Siculus, Bibliotheca Historica. Vol 1-2. Immanel Bekker. Ludwig Dindorf. Friedrich Vogel. in aedibus B. G. Teubneri. Leipzig. 1888–1890. Greek text available at the Perseus Digital Library.
Hesiod, Theogony from The Homeric Hymns and Homerica with an English Translation by Hugh G. Evelyn-White, Cambridge, MA.,Harvard University Press; London, William Heinemann Ltd. 1914. Online version at the Perseus Digital Library. Greek text available from the same website.
Homer, The Odyssey with an English Translation by A.T. Murray, PH.D. in two volumes. Cambridge, MA., Harvard University Press; London, William Heinemann, Ltd. 1919. Online version at the Perseus Digital Library. Greek text available from the same website.
Hyginus, Astronomica from The Myths of Hyginus translated and edited by Mary Grant. University of Kansas Publications in Humanistic Studies. Online version at the Topos Text Project.
Pindar, Odes translated by Diane Arnson Svarlien. 1990. Online version at the Perseus Digital Library.
Pindar, The Odes of Pindar including the Principal Fragments with an Introduction and an English Translation by Sir John Sandys, Litt.D., FBA. Cambridge, MA., Harvard University Press; London, William Heinemann Ltd. 1937. Greek text available at the Perseus Digital Library.
Pseudo-Apollodorus, The Library with an English Translation by Sir James George Frazer, F.B.A., F.R.S. in 2 Volumes, Cambridge, MA, Harvard University Press; London, William Heinemann Ltd. 1921. Online version at the Perseus Digital Library. Greek text available from the same website.

Mythological city founders
Aeolides
Kings of Iolcus
Kings in Greek mythology
Cretan characters in Greek mythology
Thessalian characters in Greek mythology
Cretan mythology
Thessalian mythology